is a town located in Kuse District, Kyoto Prefecture, Japan. As of September 1, 2022 the town has an estimated population of 15,005 and a density of 1,083 persons per km². The total area is 13.86 km².

Demographics
Per Japanese census data, the population of Kumiyama has declined slightly in recent decades.

References

External links

 Kumiyama official website 

Towns in Kyoto Prefecture